Jaso or JASO may refer to:
 Jaso State, a princely state in British India
 Japanese Automotive Standards Organization (JASO), an organization that sets automotive standards in Japan
 JASO T904, a quality classification standard of four stroke motor oils - it contains JASO T904-MA, JASO T904-MA2 and JASO T904-MB; see Motor oil#JASO
 JASO M345, a quality classification standard of two stroke motor oils – it contains JASO FA, JASO FB, JASO FC and JASO FD
 Journal of the Anthropological Society of Oxford,  an academic anthropology journal
 Jaso (자소), a letter part that makes up a block in Korean writing, in type design or IME automata

People with the surname
 John Jaso, American former baseball player.